The 1994 South Africa rugby union tour of New Zealand was a series of rugby union matches played in New Zealand by the South Africa national team from June to August 1994. The team played 14 matches in total; 11 against provincial rugby teams and 3 against New Zealand. South Africa won 10 out of the 11 matches against provincial sides, losing to Otago. They lost their first two test matches against New Zealand national and drew the last test. The South Africa coach for the tour was Ian McIntosh. This was South African's first tour to New Zealand since the controversial 1981 South Africa rugby union tour, which was received negatively by New Zealanders due to South Africa's Apartheid regime at the time.

Matches
Scores and results list South Africa's points tally first.

Touring party

Coach: Ian McIntosh
Assistant coach: Gysie Pienaar
Manager: Jannie Engelbrecht
Captain: Francois Pienaar

Backs
Gavin Johnson, Andre Joubert, Theo van Rensburg, Chris Badenhorst, James Small, Cabous van der Westhuizen, Chester Williams, Jannie Claassens, FA Meiring, Japie Mulder, Pieter Muller, Brendan Venter, Hennie le Roux, Lance Sherrell, Johan Roux, Joost van der Westhuizen

Forwards
Adriaan Richter, Tiaan Strauss, Wahl Bartmann, Ruben Kruger, Francois Pienaar, Rudolf Straeuli, Fritz van Heerden, Mark Andrews, Steve Atherton, Adri Geldenhuys, Krynauw Otto, Nico Wegner, Kobus Wiese, Keith Andrews, Guy Kebble, Ollie le Roux, Johan le Roux, Balie Swart

References

Springbok tour
South Africa
South Africa
South Africa national rugby team tours of New Zealand